Joseph Jacob Goldmark (15 August 1819 – 18 April 1881) was a Hungarian American physician and chemist, credited with the discovery of red phosphorus.

Life and career

Born in Németkeresztúr, Austro-Hungarian Empire (present-day Austria) to a Jewish family of 18 children, Goldmark entered the University of Vienna at age 16, studying medicine. 

He developed an interest in chemistry under the influence of Anton Schrötter von Kristelli. Both are credited with the discovery of red phosphorus, which Goldmark presented to the Convention of Hungarian Physicians and Naturalists.

A revolutionist in his youth, Goldmark took part as a leader in the Revolution of 1848, along with Adolf Fischhof, fighting for Jewish emancipation. 

When the revolution was stamped down, Goldmark was sentenced to death but managed to escape to the United States and settle in New York City. 

While developing the Brooklyn factory of Goldmark and Conried, he continued to be active in politics during the rest of his life. He amassed a great deal of property to leave to his large family, which included daughters Helen (wife of Felix Adler), Pauline, and Alice (wife of Louis Brandeis), and Josephine.

Goldmark's brother Karl Goldmark was a composer and music teacher in Vienna.

References

1819 births
1881 deaths
People from Oberpullendorf District
Hungarian Jews
Members of the Imperial Diet (Austria)
Hungarian chemists
Forty-Eighters